Fassifern was an electoral district of the Legislative Assembly in the Australian state of Queensland from 1873 to 1992.

It was based on the area south of Ipswich and stretched toward the New South Wales border, although in subsequent redistributions was reduced in size away from the growing Brisbane area. It was named after the Fassifern Valley.

Fassifern was a safe Country/National district for most of its existence. It was abolished in the 1991 redistribution under the Goss government, and was largely replaced by the new district of Beaudesert.

Members for Fassifern

Election results

See also
 Electoral districts of Queensland
 Members of the Queensland Legislative Assembly by year
 :Category:Members of the Queensland Legislative Assembly by name

References

Former electoral districts of Queensland
Constituencies established in 1873
Constituencies disestablished in 1992
1873 establishments in Australia
1992 disestablishments in Australia